Tommy Donnelly is an Irish former footballer who played for Drumcondra, Shamrock Rovers and Ireland.

When Donnelly played as an international there were, in effect, two Ireland teams, chosen by two rival associations. Both associations, the Northern Ireland - based IFA and the Irish Free State - based FAI claimed jurisdiction over the whole of Ireland and selected players from the whole island. Donnelly was one of several players born in Northern Ireland who benefited from the FAI's attempts to establish their all-Ireland influence. He made 2 appearances and scored 1 goal for the FAI XI. Together with fellow Northerner, Mick Hoy, he made his international debut in a 3–2 away defeat to Norway on 10 October 1937, in a qualifier for the 1938 World Cup.

Donnelly won his first cap while with Drumcondra and subsequently joined Shamrock Rovers. He made his second appearance for the FAI XI on 18 September 1938 in a friendly against Switzerland and scored the fourth goal in 4–0 win. The other goalscorers that day were Paddy Bradshaw and Connelly's Rovers teammate, Jimmy Dunne. Despite getting on the score sheet against the Swiss, Donnelly later lost his place to Kevin O'Flanagan and was released by Rovers shortly afterwards.

Honours
Shamrock Rovers

League of Ireland
Winners 1937-38: 1
League of Ireland Shield
Winners 1937-38: 1
Leinster Senior Cup
Winners 1938: 1

Sources
The Boys In Green - The FAI International Story (1997): Sean Ryan

External links
 Ireland stats

People from Enniskillen
Republic of Ireland association footballers
Republic of Ireland international footballers from Northern Ireland
Ireland (FAI) international footballers
Shamrock Rovers F.C. players
League of Ireland players
Drumcondra F.C. players
Possibly living people
Year of birth missing
Irish Free State international footballers
Association football forwards